Dunyu (meaning "shield fish" in Hanyu Pinyin) is an extinct genus of eugaleaspidiform galeaspid known from the Silurian of Yunnan, southwestern China. Two species are known: D longiforus, the type species and D. xiushanensis, which was initially named as a species of Eugaleaspis. The type specimen of D. longiforus is IVPP V 17681, a complete cephalic shield prepared by C. H. Xiong, and the holotype of D. xiushanensis is IVPP V 6793.1, another complete cephalic shield.

See also
 Binhai Yongdong (Yongdongaspis)

References

Galeaspida
Prehistoric jawless fish genera
Silurian jawless fish
Fossil taxa described in 2012